Eternal Turn of the Wheel (Ukrainian Вічний оберт колеса, Vichnyy obert kolesa) is the ninth studio album by Ukrainian black metal band Drudkh, released on February 24 (March 13 in the USA), 2012, through Season of Mist's Underground Activists label.

Track listing

Personnel
 Thurios – vocals, keyboards
 Roman Saenko – guitars, bass
 Krechet – bass, keyboards
 Vlad – drums, keyboards

References

Drudkh albums
2012 albums
Season of Mist albums